Lar Din Maw Yar (born 6 August 1992) is a footballer from Myanmar who plays as a midfielder for Hanthawaddy United.

References

1992 births
Living people
Burmese footballers
Association football forwards
Myanmar international footballers